Patrick Murney (born 1987) is an American actor known for his recurring roles in Seven Seconds, Mare of Easttown, Law & Order: Organized Crime, and others.

Early life and education 
Born in New York City in 1987, Murney is the son of actor Christopher Murney and the brother of actress Julia Murney. After graduating from the Dwight School in 2005, Murney studied acting at Syracuse University, where he spent a semester abroad in London and another in Manhattan through the Tepper semester program.

Career 
Murney made his first television appearance in the pilot episode of Family Values. The film was not selected for a full series order. Murney has since appeared in episodes of Law & Order, Suits, Onion News Network, Public Morals, and others.

Filmography

Television

Video games

References

External links 
https://m.imdb.com/name/nm2727142

Living people
Actors from Pennsylvania
Male actors from Pennsylvania
1987 births
People from New York City